Zid is a 1976 Indian Hindi-language film directed by Vijay, starring  Nutan, Sarika, Sachin and Premnath.

Plot

Cast 

Nutan
Sarika
Sachin
Premnath

Music 
All songs were written by Ravindra Jain.

"Tere Liye Maine Thami Re Mala" – Asha Bhosle, Jaspal Singh
"Holi Hai Ho Ho La La La" – Jaspal Singh, Asha Bhosle
"Teri Palko Ke Tale" – Jaspal Singh
"Jab Talak Dum Me Dum" – Asha Bhosle
"Is Mitti Ke Kan Kan Ka" – Mahendra Kapoor

References

External links 
 
 

1976 films
1970s Hindi-language films
Films scored by Ravindra Jain